Women Film Pioneers Project is a freely accessible, collaborative, online-only database resource, produced with support from Columbia University.

Development
Women Film Pioneers Project was founded in 1993, by Jane Gaines, a film scholar and visiting professor at Vassar College, when Gaines joined the Film & Media Studies Program at Columbia University, officially launching in October 2013 as an online-only resource, produced in partnership with Columbia University Libraries, with support from Columbia University, School of the Arts, Film Program.

Resources 
Individual profiles rely on primary documents, digitized resources, film prints, paper collections, government records, other archival materials, and family recollections and memoirs.

Overview essays are longer, peer-reviewed, essays that go beyond a single individual.

Management
By 2016, Kate Saccone had become Project Manager.

Contributors
Contributors, among the more than 200, include:
 
 Richard Abel
 Kay Armatage
 Rebecca Barry
 Livia Bloom
 Kelly Brown
 Julie Buck

 Sofia Bull
 Barbara Hall
 Jane Gaines
 Margaret Hennefeld
 Joanne Hershfield

 Annette Kuhn
 Kendra Preston Leonard
 Jill Julius Matthews
 Jan Olsson
 Karen Pearlman
 Louis Pelletier
 Kathryn Fuller-Seeley
 Shelley Stamp
 Tom Trusky
 Julia Tuñón
 Deb Verhoeven
 Xin Peng
 Robert von Dassanowsky

Critical Reception 
"It wasn’t until a wave of scholarship arrived in the nineteen-nineties—the meticulous research done by the Women Film Pioneers Project, at Columbia, has been particularly important—that women’s outsized role in the origins of moviemaking came into focus again."—Margaret Talbot

"The Women Film Pioneers Project at Columbia University must be credited with undertaking and compiling much of the research to date."—Melody Bridges and Cheryl Robson

"There is criminally little research and writing on the often astounding careers of female editors. The same might well be said about many of their male counterparts, since most editors do tend to be unseen artists. Yet men came to dominate the field by the late 1920s and continue that hegemony today. Recent historians’ efforts have reclaimed some attention for many female filmmakers, especially in the area of silent film studies. The Women Film Pioneers Project at Columbia University (wfpp.cdrs.columbia.edu) is one of the best. Through efforts like this it is now well known that many women played central roles in the founding of the film industry."—Betsy A. McLane

Further reading

See also 
 Center for Digital Research and Scholarship

References

External links
 

Online person databases
Internet properties established in 2013
American film websites
Women film pioneers